= Red Bull Futsal League =

- Founded: 2016
- Country: Nepal
- Confederation: AFC
- Number of clubs: 16
- Level on pyramid: 1
- Current champions: Sankhamul Futsal (2016)
- Most championships: Sankhamul Futsal

Red Bull Futsal League (Nepali: रेडबुल फुटसल लिग) is a professional futsal tournament in Nepal, started in 2016.

Total 16 futsal teams or clubs are participant in first tournament.

== History ==
With the aim to promote Futsal in Nepal on a professional level, Red Bull brings to you the first ever Red Bull Futsal League 2073. The league has a lucrative cash prize of NPR 10 Lakh for the champion. Red Bull is the title sponsor of the league which AMA Events has organized. With an aim to make football more popular in the country, Red Bull is associated with other major tournaments in the country - Martyrs Memorial A Division League, Red Bull National League and Red Bull Budha Subba Gold Cup. All the teams in Red Bull Futsal League will compete in 112 games under the home and away format. The total 16 teams selected from qualifying rounds have been divided into two groups of 8 teams each. As the league progresses, top 4 teams from each group will play in the Quarter Finals, the Semi Finals and the Finals till the end. The winners of the four- month long league will collect a cash prize of 10 Lakh rupees, while the runners-up will get Rs. 5 Lakh. The best player of the tournament and goalkeeper will walk away with a cash prize of Rs. 50,000 each. Red bull Futsal League is a biggest futsal tournament of Nepal.

== Tournament format ==
All the teams in Red Bull Futsal League will compete in 112 games under the home and away format. The total 16 teams selected from qualifying rounds have been divided into two groups of 8 teams each. As the league progresses, top 4 teams from each group will play in the Quarter Finals, the Semi Finals and the Finals till the end

== Winners ==
Season	Winner
Red BullFutsal League
2016	Sankhamul Futsal

== Final result ==
Season	Winner	Score	Runner-up
2016	Sankhamul Futsal	3-2	Samakhusi Futsal

== Prize money ==
- First:-($1,000,000,000|-)
- Second:-($5,00,000,000|-)

== Award of season ==
=== Best player ===
season	player	club
2016	Nabin Lama	Samakhusi Futsal

=== Best Goalkeeper ===
season	player	club
2025	Amir Indiana	Kick-Off Futsal
